My Fair Lady is a 1964 American musical comedy-drama film adapted from the 1956 Lerner and Loewe stage musical based on George Bernard Shaw's 1913 stage play Pygmalion. With a screenplay by Alan Jay Lerner and directed by George Cukor, the film depicts a poor Cockney flower-seller named Eliza Doolittle who overhears an arrogant phonetics professor, Henry Higgins, as he casually wagers that he could teach her to speak "proper" English, thereby making her presentable in the high society of Edwardian London.

The film stars Audrey Hepburn as Eliza Doolittle and Rex Harrison as Henry Higgins - both reprising their roles from the stage musical - with Stanley Holloway, Gladys Cooper and Wilfrid Hyde-White in supporting roles. A critical and commercial success, it became the highest-grossing film of 1964 and won eight Academy Awards, including Best Picture, Best Director and Best Actor. In 1998, the American Film Institute named it the 91st greatest American film of all time. In 2006 it was ranked eighth in the AFI's Greatest Movie Musicals list.

In 2018, the film was selected for preservation in the United States National Film Registry by the Library of Congress as being "culturally, historically, or aesthetically significant."

Plot
In London, Professor Henry Higgins, a scholar of phonetics, believes that the accent and tone of one's voice determines a person's prospects in society ("Why Can't the English?"). At the Covent Garden fruit-and-vegetable market one evening, he meets Colonel Hugh Pickering, himself a phonetics expert who had come from India to see him. Higgins boasts he could teach even Eliza Doolittle, the young flower seller woman with a strong Cockney accent, to speak so well he could pass her off as a duchess at an embassy ball. Eliza's ambition is to work in a flower shop, but her accent makes that impossible ("Wouldn't It Be Loverly"). The following morning, Eliza shows up at Higgins' home, seeking lessons. Pickering is intrigued and offers to cover all the attendant expenses if Higgins succeeds. Higgins agrees and describes how women ruin lives ("I'm an Ordinary Man").

Eliza's father, Alfred P. Doolittle, a dustman, learns of his daughter's new residence ("With a Little Bit of Luck"). He shows up at Higgins' house three days later, ostensibly to protect his daughter's virtue, but in reality to extract some money from Higgins, and is bought off with £5. Higgins is impressed by the man's honesty, his natural gift for language, and especially his brazen lack of morals. Higgins recommends Alfred to a wealthy American who is interested in morality.

Eliza endures Higgins' demanding teaching methods and treatment of her personally ("Just You Wait"), while the servants feel both annoyed with the noise as well as pitiful for Higgins ("Servants' Chorus"). She makes no progress, but just as she, Higgins, and Pickering are about to give up, Eliza finally "gets it" ("The Rain in Spain"); she instantly begins to speak with an impeccable upper-class accent, and is overjoyed at her breakthrough ("I Could Have Danced All Night").

As a trial run, Higgins takes her to Ascot Racecourse ("Ascot Gavotte"), where she makes a good impression initially, only to shock everyone by a sudden lapse into vulgar Cockney while cheering on a horse. Higgins partly conceals a grin behind his hand. At Ascot, she meets Freddy Eynsford-Hill, a young upper-class man who becomes infatuated with her ("On the Street Where You Live").

Higgins then takes Eliza to an embassy ball for the final test, where she dances with a foreign prince. Also present is Zoltan Karpathy, a Hungarian phonetics expert trained by Higgins, who is an impostor detector. After he dances with Eliza, he declares that she is a Hungarian princess.

Afterward, Eliza's hard work is barely acknowledged, with all the praise going to Higgins ("You Did It"). This and his callous treatment of her, especially his indifference to her future, causes her to walk out on him, but not before she throws Higgins' slippers at him, leaving him mystified by her ingratitude ("Just You Wait (Reprise)"). Outside, Freddy is still waiting ("On the Street Where You Live (Reprise)") and greets Eliza, who is irritated by him as all he does is talk ("Show Me"). Eliza tries to return to her old life but finds that she no longer fits in. She meets her father, who has been left a large fortune by the wealthy American to whom Higgins had recommended him, and is resigned to marrying Eliza's stepmother. Alfred feels that Higgins has ruined him, lamenting that he is now bound by "middle-class morality", in which he gets drunk before his wedding day ("Get Me to the Church On Time"). Eliza eventually ends up visiting Higgins' mother, who is outraged at her son's callous behavior.

The next day, Higgins finds Eliza gone and searches for her ("A Hymn to Him"), eventually finding her at his mother's house. Higgins attempts to talk Eliza into coming back to him. He becomes angered when she announces that she is going to marry Freddy and become Karpathy's assistant ("Without You"). He makes his way home, stubbornly predicting that she will come crawling back. However, he comes to the unsettling realization that she has become an important part of his life ("I've Grown Accustomed to Her Face"). He enters his house feeling lonely, reflecting on his callous behaviour and missing Eliza so much that he turns on his gramophone and listens to her voice. Suddenly, Eliza reappears at the door and turns it off to catch his attention, with Higgins asking, "Eliza, where the devil are my slippers?"

Cast
 Audrey Hepburn as Eliza Doolittle
 Rex Harrison as Professor Henry Higgins
 Stanley Holloway as Alfred P. Doolittle
 Wilfrid Hyde-White as Colonel Hugh Pickering
 Gladys Cooper as Mrs. Higgins
 Jeremy Brett as Freddy Eynsford-Hill
 Theodore Bikel as Zoltan Karpathy
 Mona Washbourne as Mrs. Pearce, Higgins' housekeeper
 Isobel Elsom as Mrs. Eynsford-Hill
 John Holland as the Butler

Uncredited:
 John Alderson as Jamie
 Marjorie Bennett as Cockney with pipe
 Betty Blythe as Lady at the ball
 Walter Burke as Cockney bystander telling Eliza about Higgins taking notes about her
 Henry Daniell as the British Ambassador (in his last film role)
 Charles Fredericks as the King in Eliza's fantasy (only in the film version, not in the CD version) 
 Jack Greening as George, the bartender
 Lillian Kemble-Cooper as Female Ambassador (in yellow dress) at the ball
 Queenie Leonard as Cockney bystander
 Moyna Macgill as Lady Boxington
 Philo McCullough as Ball Guest
 John McLiam as Harry
 Alan Napier as Gentleman who escorts Eliza to the Queen of Transylvania
 Barbara Pepper as Doolittle's dancing partner
 Olive Reeves-Smith as Mrs. Hopkins
 Baroness Rothschild as the Queen of Transylvania
 Grady Sutton as Ball Guest

Musical numbers

 "Overture" – played by orchestra
 "Why Can't the English Learn to Speak?" – performed by Rex Harrison, Wilfrid Hyde-White and Audrey Hepburn
 "Wouldn't It Be Loverly?" – performed by Audrey Hepburn (dubbed by Marni Nixon) and chorus
 "An Ordinary Man" – performed by Rex Harrison
 "With a Little Bit of Luck" – performed by Stanley Holloway, John Alderson, John McLiam, and chorus
 "Just You Wait" – sung by Audrey Hepburn (partially dubbed by Nixon) and Charles Fredericks
 "Servants Chorus" – sung by Mona Washbourne and chorus
 "The Rain in Spain" – performed by Rex Harrison, Wilfrid Hyde-White, and Audrey Hepburn (partially dubbed by Nixon)
 "I Could Have Danced All Night" – performed by Audrey Hepburn (dubbed by Nixon), Mona Washbourne and chorus
 "Ascot Gavotte" – sung by chorus
 "Ascot Gavotte (Reprise)" – sung by chorus
 "On the Street Where You Live" – sung by Jeremy Brett (dubbed by Bill Shirley)
 "Intermission" – played by orchestra
 "Transylvanian March" – played by orchestra
 "Embassy Waltz" – played by orchestra
 "You Did It" – performed by Rex Harrison, Wilfrid Hyde-White, and chorus
 "Just You Wait (Reprise)" – sung by Audrey Hepburn
 "On the Street Where You Live" (reprise) – sung by Jeremy Brett (dubbed by Shirley)
 "Show Me" – performed by Audrey Hepburn (dubbed by Marni Nixon) and Jeremy Brett (dubbed by Shirley)
 "Wouldn't It Be Loverly" (reprise) – performed by Audrey Hepburn (dubbed by Marni Nixon) and chorus
 "Get Me to the Church on Time" – performed by Stanley Holloway, John Alderson, John McLiam, and chorus
 "A Hymn to Him (Why Can't A Woman Be More Like a Man?)" – performed by Rex Harrison and Wilfrid Hyde-White
 "Without You" – performed by Audrey Hepburn (dubbed by Nixon) and Rex Harrison
 "I've Grown Accustomed to Her Face" – performed by Rex Harrison
 "Finale" – played by orchestra

The partly-spoken delivery of the songs given by Harrison is a well-known example of sprechstimme.

Production

CBS head William S. Paley financed the original Broadway production in exchange for the rights to the cast album (through Columbia Records). Warner Bros. bought the film rights in February 1962 for the then-unprecedented sum of $5.5 million (equivalent to $ million in ) plus 47¼% of the gross over $20 million. It was agreed that the rights to the film would revert to CBS seven years following release.

Order of musical numbers
The order of the songs in the Broadway show was followed faithfully with the exception of "With a Little Bit of Luck"; the song is listed as the third musical number in the play, but in the film, it is the fourth. On stage, the song is split into two parts sung in two different scenes. Part of the song is sung by Doolittle and his cronies just after Eliza gives him part of her earnings, immediately before she goes to Higgins to ask for speech lessons. The second half of the song is sung by Doolittle just after he discovers that Eliza is now living with Higgins. In the film, the entire song is sung in one scene that takes place just after Higgins has sung "I'm an Ordinary Man." However, the song does have a dialogue scene (Doolittle's conversation with Eliza's landlady) between verses.

The instrumental "Busker Sequence", which opens the play immediately after the overture, is the only musical number from the play omitted in the film version. However, several measures from the piece may be heard when Eliza is in the rain, making her way through Covent Garden.

All of the songs in the film were performed in their entirety, but some verses were omitted. For example, in the song "With a Little Bit of Luck", the verse "He does not have a tuppence in his pocket," which was sung with a chorus, was omitted because of its space and length; the original verse in "Show Me" was used instead.

The stanzas of "You Did It" that come after Higgins says "She is a princess" were originally written for the stage, but Harrison hated the lyrics and refused to perform the song unless the lyrics were omitted, as they were in most Broadway versions. However, when Cukor threatened to leave the production if the omitted lyrics were not restored for the film version, Harrison obliged. The omitted lyrics end with the words "Hungarian rhapsody" followed by the servants shouting "Bravo" three times, to the strains of Liszt's "Hungarian Rhapsody", before the servants sing "Congratulations, Professor Higgins."

Dubbing
Hepburn's singing was judged inadequate, and she was dubbed by Marni Nixon, who sang all songs except "Just You Wait", in which Hepburn's voice was preserved during the harsh-toned chorus, with Nixon on the melodic bridge section. Hepburn sang the brief reprise of the song in tears. Some of Hepburn's original vocal performances were released in the 1990s. Less well known is the fact that Jeremy Brett's songs (as Freddy) were dubbed by Bill Shirley.

Harrison declined to prerecord his musical numbers, explaining that he had never talked his way through the songs the same way twice and thus could not convincingly lip-sync to a playback recording during filming (according to Jack L. Warner, dubbing had been commonplace for years, stating, "We even dubbed Rin Tin Tin."). George Groves equipped Harrison with a wireless microphone, the first such use during filming of a motion picture. The sound department earned an Academy Award for its efforts.

Intermission
One of the few differences in structure between the stage version and the film is the placement of the intermission. In the stage play, the intermission occurs after  the embassy ball at which Eliza dances with Karpathy. In the film, the intermission comes before the ball as Eliza, Higgins and Pickering are seen departing for the embassy.

Art direction
Gene Allen, Cecil Beaton and George James Hopkins won an Academy Award for Best Production Design. Beaton's inspiration for Higgins' library was a room at the Château de Groussay, Montfort-l'Amaury, in France, which had been decorated opulently by its owner, Carlos de Beistegui. Hats were created by Parisian milliner Madame Paulette at Beaton's request.

Release

Theatrical
The film had its premiere at the Criterion Theatre in New York on Wednesday, October 21, 1964, with its regular run starting the following day with a $500,000 advance.

Home media
My Fair Lady was released in Ultra HD Blu-ray on May 25, 2021 by CBS' sister company and current rights holder, Paramount Home Entertainment.

Reception
With a production budget of $17 million, My Fair Lady was the most expensive film shot in the United States up to that time. The film was re-released in 1971 and earned rentals of $2 million in the United States and Canada. It was re-released again in 1994, this time by 20th Century Fox, after a thorough restoration. In 2019, the film was given a limited theatrical re-release through Turner Classic Movies and Fathom Events on February 17 and 20 as part of TCM Big Screen Classics.

My Fair Lady holds a 94% approval rating on Rotten Tomatoes based on 88 reviews, with an average rating of 8.6/10. The consensus states: "George Cukor's elegant, colorful adaptation of the beloved stage play is elevated to new heights thanks to winning performances by Audrey Hepburn and Rex Harrison."

Bosley Crowther of The New York Times opened his contemporary review: "As Henry Higgins might have whooped, 'By George, they've got it!' They've made a superlative film from the musical stage show My Fair Lady—a film that enchantingly conveys the rich endowments of the famous stage production in a fresh and flowing cinematic form." Philip K. Scheuer of the Los Angeles Times reported from the New York premiere that "when the curtains came together at the finish of just three hours, three hours of Technicolored entertainment, I heard myself all but echoing Col. Pickering's proud summation of Eliza Doolittle's performances as a duchess at the Embassy Ball, 'a total triumph.'" Robert J. Landry of Variety wrote: "It has riches of story, humor, acting and production values far beyond the average big picture. It is Hollywood at its best, Jack L. Warner's career capstone and a film that will go on without  limits of playoff in reserved seat policy and world rentals." The Monthly Film Bulletin of the UK declared that "with the range of talent, taste and sheer professionalism at work, from Shaw onwards, Warners could hardly have made a film which would do less than please most of the people most of the time. Their $17,000,000 investment looks as safe as houses." The review opined that Cukor directed with "great tact" but "a rather unnecessary circumspection. Scenes move at a steady, even pace, as though every word were worth its weight in gold (perhaps, in view of the price paid for the rights, it very nearly was). Especially, the decor tends to inhibit rather than release the film." Brendan Gill of The New Yorker wrote that the film "has survived very nearly intact the always risky leap from stage to screen," adding, "Miss Hepburn isn't particularly convincing as a Cockney flower girl, but, having mastered her vowels and consonants in the 'rain in Spain' scene, she comes into her own." Richard L. Coe of The Washington Post also suggested that Hepburn's casting was the film's "basic flaw", describing her as "recognizably exquisite—but not 21—as the flower girl and to the later scenes she brings a real flirtatiousness quite un-Shavian." Nevertheless, Coe remarked that "there are some marvelous things which will make this a long-loved film," including Rex Harrison giving "one of the classic screen performances" that he correctly predicted was "an absolute certainty for next year's Oscars."

Chicago Sun-Times critic Roger Ebert gave the film four stars out of four, and, in 2006, he put it on his "Great Movies" list, praising Hepburn's performance, and calling the film "the best and most unlikely of musicals." James Berardinelli wrote in a retrospective review, "Few genres of films are as magical as musicals, and few musicals are as intelligent and lively as My Fair Lady. It's a classic not because a group of stuffy film experts have labeled it as such, but because it has been, and always will be, a pure joy to experience."

Dave Whitaker of DavesMovieDatabase, a film aggregator site that combines other lists with box-office, ratings, and awards, lists My Fair Lady as the 100th greatest movie of all-time, as the 9th greatest Musical of all-time, and as the 30th most awarded movie of all-time.

Retrospective analysis of My Fair Lady has been more mixed, with disagreement between reviewers about whether the movie critiques or affirms misogynistic and classist tropes.

Awards and nominations

Restoration
The film was restored in 1994 by James C. Katz and Robert A. Harris, who had restored Spartacus three years earlier. The restoration was commissioned and financed by CBS, to which the film rights reverted from Warner Bros. in 1971. CBS would later hire Harris to lend his expertise to a new 4K restoration of the film for a 2015 Blu-ray release, working from 8K scans of the original camera negative and other surviving 65mm elements.

Planned remake
A new film of the musical was planned in 2008 with a screenplay by Emma Thompson but the project did not materialize. Keira Knightley, Carey Mulligan, and Colin Firth were among those in consideration for the lead roles.

Soundtrack

Original Columbia Records LP
All tracks played by the Warner Bros. Studio Orchestra conducted by André Previn. Between brackets the singers.
 "Overture"
 "Why Can't the English Learn to Speak?" (Rex Harrison, Audrey Hepburn, Wilfrid Hyde-White)
 "Wouldn't It Be Loverly?" (Marni Nixon (for Hepburn))
 "I'm an Ordinary Man" (Harrison)
 "With a Little Bit of Luck" (Stanley Holloway)
 "Just You Wait" (Hepburn, Nixon)
 "The Rain in Spain" (Harrison, Hepburn, Nixon, Hyde-White)
 "I Could Have Danced All Night" (Nixon, Hepburn (one line))
 "Ascot Gavotte"
 "On the Street Where You Live" (Bill Shirley (for Jeremy Brett))
 "You Did It" (Harrison, Hyde-White) (without the choir "Congratulations")
 "Show Me" (Nixon, Shirley)
 "Get Me to the Church on Time" (Holloway)
 "A Hymn to Him (Why Can't a Woman Be More Like a Man?)" (Harrison, Hyde-White)
 "Without You" (Nixon, Harrison)
 "I've Grown Accustomed to Her Face" (Harrison)

Previously unreleased on LP, though included on the CD
 "The Flower Market"
 "Servants' Chorus"
 "Ascot Gavotte (Reprise)"
 "Intermission"
 "The Transylvanian March"
 "The Embassy Waltz"
 "You Did It" (Harrison, Hyde-White) (with the servant's final choir "Congratulations")
 "Just You Wait (Reprise)" (Audrey Hepburn)
 "On the Street Where You Live (Reprise)" (Shirley)
 "The Flowermarket" (containing the reprise of "Wouldn't It Be Loverly?") (Nixon)
 "End Titles"
 "Exit Music"

See also

 List of American films of 1964

Notes

References

Bibliography

External links

 
 
 
 
 
 

1964 films
1964 comedy-drama films
1964 musical comedy films
1964 romantic comedy films
1960s American films
1960s English-language films
1960s musical comedy-drama films
1960s romantic comedy-drama films
1960s romantic musical films
André Previn albums
American musical comedy-drama films
American romantic comedy-drama films
American romantic musical films
Best Film BAFTA Award winners
Best Musical or Comedy Picture Golden Globe winners
Best Picture Academy Award winners
Films about gender
Films based on classical mythology
Films based on musicals
Films based on works by George Bernard Shaw
Films directed by George Cukor
Films featuring a Best Actor Academy Award-winning performance
Films featuring a Best Musical or Comedy Actor Golden Globe winning performance
Films scored by André Previn
Films scored by Frederick Loewe
Films set in the 1910s
Films set in London
Films shot in Los Angeles County, California
Films that won the Best Costume Design Academy Award
Films that won the Best Original Score Academy Award
Films that won the Best Sound Mixing Academy Award
Films whose art director won the Best Art Direction Academy Award
Films whose cinematographer won the Best Cinematography Academy Award
Films whose director won the Best Directing Academy Award
Films whose director won the Best Director Golden Globe
Films with screenplays by Alan Jay Lerner
United States National Film Registry films
Warner Bros. films